Western Eye Hospital is an ophthalmology hospital in west London. It is managed by the Imperial College Healthcare NHS Trust.

History
The hospital was founded by Henry Obre and John Woolcott, both surgeons, at St John's Place in Lisson Grove as the St Marylebone Eye and Ear Institution in 1856. It moved to a larger facilities in Marylebone Road in 1860 and an out-patients department was opened by the Marquess of Ripon in 1904. After the existing facility at Marylebone Road became very dilapidated, a new purpose-built facility was built on the same site and opened in March 1930. It joined the National Health Service in 1948 and was renamed the Western Eye Hospital in 1993.

Facilities
The hospital operates a daily emergency department, for ambulance and walk-in cases. It features a minor surgical theatre, a triage system and two ophthalmic operating theatres. It treats a wide range of eye conditions from glaucoma, cataract, retinal tears, to wet age-related macular degeneration (AMD), a major cause of blindness.

Alumni and staff
 Bashar al-Assad -  President of Syria (attended postgraduate studies at the Western Eye Hospital, specializing in vitreoretinal ophthalmology). There al-Assad’s consultant supervisor remarked “He was an extremely kind person and a warm personality" while a nurse went on the record stating he was “calm at the operating table and had a wonderful manner with the patients . . . He spoke with every patient just before surgery to reassure them all would be well.”
 Tania Mathias - former British MP and UN refugee worker

See also
 List of hospitals in England

References

Sources

External links 

 
 Western Eye Hospital on the NHS website
 Care Quality Commission inspection reports
 Lost Hospitals of London  Western Eye Hospital - history of the hospital to the present

Imperial College Healthcare NHS Trust
NHS hospitals in London
Health in the City of Westminster
Specialist hospitals in England
Eye hospitals in the United Kingdom
Hospitals established in 1856

fr:St-Mary's Hospital